Acalypta hellenica is a species of bug from Tingidae family, and Tinginae subfamily that can be found in Bosnia, Bulgaria, Canary Islands, Croatia, France, Denmark, Greece, Italy, Spain, and Ukraine.

References

Hemiptera of Europe
Insects described in 1888
Tingidae